There are over 20,000 Grade II* listed buildings in England. This page is a list of these buildings in the district of Boston in Lincolnshire.

List of buildings

|}

See also

 Grade I listed buildings in Boston (borough)

Notes

Lists of Grade II* listed buildings in Lincolnshire
 
Grade II* listed buildings in Boston (borough)